Großmonra is a village and a former municipality in the Sömmerda district of Thuringia, Germany. Since 31 December 2012, it has been part of the town Kölleda.

References

Former municipalities in Thuringia